Abdul Rahman bin Saud Al Saud ( ʿAbd ar Raḥman bin Suʿūd Āl Suʿūd; 19 November 1946 – 29 July 2004) was a Saudi prince and the longtime president of the football club Al Nassr.

Biography
Prince Abdul Rahman was born in Riyadh on 19 November 1946. He was a son of King Saud. His mother was Al Jawhara bint Turki bin Ahmed Al Sudairi, who died when Prince Abdul Rahman was fifteen years old. Prince Abdul Rahman completed his education at Ma'had Al Anjal School. 

Prince Abdul Rahman and his brother Prince Mishaal were the first sons of King Saud who declared allegiance to King Faisal, successor of the former, following the abdication of King Saud in 1964. His allegiance to King Faisal was announced on 25 November 1964. Then he began to serve as the director general of budget and finance at the ministry of finance.

He was well known as godfather of Al-Nassr Club as he spent more than 36 years as the president of the popular Saudi sports club. He was the head of Al-Nassr for 3 stints: (1960–1969), (1975–1997) and (2000–2005). His love of the team made him accept the challenge of being the president of a second division club and turning it to a champion.

Personal life and death

Prince Abdul Rahman married twice. He had six sons and three daughters. 

Prince Abdul Rahman bin Saud had three sons and two daughters with Princess Al Anoud bint Abdullah, daughter of his father's uncle Abdullah bin Abdul Rahman:
 Prince Mamdouh, who has four children: Prince Saud, Princess Al Jawhara, Princess Al Hunuf, and Princess Al Rym.
 Princess Manal
 Princess Ahad
 Prince Saud
 Prince Fahd

Prince Abdul Rahman had three sons and one daughter with his paternal cousin Princess Al Jawhara bint Nasser, daughter of his uncle Prince Nasser bin Abdulaziz:
 Prince Khalid, who has seven children: Prince Bandar, Princess Al Jawhara, Prince Abdulaziz, Princess Mashael, Prince Abdul Rahman, Prince Saud, and Prince Mohammed.
 Prince Abdulaziz, who has three children: Princess Anoud, Princess Jawahir and Prince Abdulaziz.
 Prince Faisal
 Princess Al Jawhara

Prince Abdul Rahman died of a heart attack on 29 July 2004 at age 58. His funeral prayers were performed at Imam Turki bin Abdullah Mosque in Riyadh on 30 July 2004.

References

External links

20th-century Saudi Arabian businesspeople
1946 births
2004 deaths
Al Nassr FC
Abdul Rahman